The Wissigstock is a mountain of the Urner Alps. It lies on the border between the Swiss cantons of Obwalden and Uri. The closest locality is Engelberg on the west side.

References

External links
 Wissigstock on Hikr

Mountains of the Alps
Mountains of Obwalden
Mountains of the canton of Uri
Obwalden–Uri border
Mountains of Switzerland